= RCMP Technical Security Branch =

Former branch of the Royal Canadian Mounted Police

The Technical Security Branch was a branch of the Royal Canadian Mounted Police within its Technical Operations Directorate. It was responsible for physical and informational technology security within the Canadian federal government.

The branch developed technical standards and guidance for physical and information technology security, advised federal departments, provided training, and conducted or advised on intrusion security. The branch also participated in research and evaluation of security technologies, including biometric technologies for access-control and other police and government applications.

Publications produced by the branch continue to be cited in RCMP physical security guidances. For instance, a 2021 RCMP guide references Technical Security Branch publications regarding access control, protecting computer servers, guard services, identification cards, and security control centers.
